On June 6, 2021, a man rammed a pickup truck into Muslim Pakistani Canadian pedestrians at an intersection in London, Ontario, Canada. Four people were killed, and another was wounded; all were from the same family. Police say the attack was motivated by Islamophobia. The attack was the deadliest mass killing in London's history. It was condemned by Canadian leaders, and called terrorism by Prime Minister of Canada Justin Trudeau, Prime Minister of Pakistan Imran Khan and Premier of Ontario Doug Ford. The suspect was charged with four counts of terroristic murder and one count of terroristic attempted murder.

Attack
At about 8:40 pm on June 6, 2021, a man mounted a curb and drove his pickup truck into five members of a family. According to police, this attack was intentional, and motivated by anti-Muslim hatred. The attack took place at the intersection of Hyde Park Road and South Carriage Road in London's Hyde Park neighbourhood, where the family had been waiting to cross. A witness described being stopped at a red light when the truck sped past her, shaking her car from the force. One woman was pronounced dead at the scene, and the others were rushed to a hospital, three of them later succumbed to their wounds.

The driver of the truck, 20-year-old Nathaniel Veltman, approached the cab driver, said that he had just killed someone and asked the cabbie to call the police. Speaking on behalf of the traumatized driver, Yellow Taxi London president Hassan Savehilaghi described Veltman as wearing a military-style helmet and a bullet-proof vest which may have been tagged with swastikas, and the truck was covered with blood. Savehilaghi's description was corroborated by a mall maintenance worker who also witnessed the arrest. The driver called 9-1-1 and waved down a passing police cruiser. Veltman allegedly laughed as he was arrested, and asked the driver to film it.

Victims
The five victims were all from the same family and Muslims; most arrived in Canada from Pakistan in 2007. The dead were a 46-year-old husband, his 44-year-old wife, their 15-year-old daughter and his 74-year-old mother. The only survivor, the family's nine-year-old boy was seriously injured. On June 14, a family friend said he was out of the hospital.

Accused
By June 7, Nathaniel Veltman was charged with four counts of first-degree murder and one count of attempted murder. The London Police Service believe he planned the attack in advance. He was wearing a body-armour-style vest at the time of his arrest, and might have participated in an airsoft shooting game that evening before the collision. He had no previous connection to the victims or known ties to hate groups.

Veltman worked at an egg-packing facility in Strathroy and lived in an apartment on Covent Market Place in downtown London. One friend and co-worker who was raised as a Muslim described him as a proud Christian, and noted he seemed to treat Muslims normally for the four years he worked there. Co-workers said the alleged murders and motivation seemed out-of-character and unexpected, one denying Veltman is a radical terrorist or Islamophobe.

During Veltman's parents' divorce in 2016, he was described as "peculiar and challenging", and both agreed he should continue therapy and be supervised around his younger siblings.

Legal proceedings 
Shortly after the attack, Crown attorneys charged Veltman with four counts of first-degree murder and one count of attempted murder. He made a court appearance on June 10, without a lawyer, so was given time to find one. On June 14, the charges were all upgraded to include terrorism, and the court adjourned until June 21. Many details of the case are under a publication ban.

Reactions
The House of Commons held a moment of silence for the victims. The attack was condemned by Prime Minister Justin Trudeau, the Islamic Supreme Council of Canada, Calgary mayor Naheed Nenshi, the National Council of Canadian Muslims and Prime Minister of Pakistan Imran Khan all of whom called it an act of terrorism motivated by hatred. All parties in the Canadian parliament agreed to call "an emergency national action summit to tackle Islamophobia."

A vigil was held on June 8, at the London Muslim Mosque. Premier of Ontario Doug Ford temporarily lifted provincial COVID-19 restrictions in London for it to proceed. Trudeau, Ford and London mayor Ed Holder attended, among thousands more. On June 12, a public funeral was held with hundreds in attendance.

In June 2022, the city of London and other organizations organized an event in honour of those killed as well as to generate awareness about Islamophobia. Over 1000 people attended the event, including Prime Minister Trudeau.

See also 
Islamophobia in Canada
Toronto van attack (2018)
Quebec City mosque shooting (2017)

References

2021 in Ontario
2021 road incidents
2020s road incidents in North America
Attacks in Canada in 2021
Islamophobia in Canada
Islam-related controversies in North America
June 2021 events in Canada
Truck
Violence against Muslims
Road incidents in Canada
Vehicular rampage in Canada
Family murders
Islam in Ontario
2021 murders in Canada
Mass murder in 2021